Ingeborg Hoff (November 15, 1911 – April 8, 1993) was a Norwegian linguist. In 1948, she was awarded the Doctor of Philosophy degree and hired as a Senior Archivist at the Norwegian Dialect Archive at the University of Oslo. She was promoted to the position of Docent from 1970 and made Head of the Norwegian Dialect Archive in 1972, positions she held until her retirement in 1981. A Festschrift in her honor was written on the occasion of her retirement.

Bibliography
 Hoff, Ingeborg. Skjetvemålet: utsyn over lydvoksteren i målet i Skiptvet i Østfold i jamføring med andre østfoldske mål. Jacob Dybwad, Oslo. 1946.

References

 

1911 births
1993 deaths
Linguists from Norway
University of Oslo alumni
20th-century linguists